Hokejový Klub mesta Zvolen is a professional Slovak ice hockey club based in Zvolen. The club has won the Slovak league championship three times (2001, 2013, 2021) and the IIHF Continental Cup in 2005. The team is nicknamed Rytieri; it means Knights in English.

History

Previous names
ZTK Zvolen (1927 – 1964)
LB Zvolen (1964 – 1983)
ZTK Zvolen (1983 – 1993)
HK Hell Zvolen (1994)
HKm Zvolen (1995 – 2005)
HKM a.s. Zvolen (since 2006)

Early history
The club was founded on 18 March 1927 as ZTC Zvolen. However, they played their first official game in 1932 against Slávia Banská Bystrica. They lost 0–18 in the first game and 1–20 in the second game against Slávia. Zvolen played their first home game on 14 February 1932. They lost 0–2 against Slávia. In the 1933–34 season they played for the first time in organized competition, the Championship of Stredoslovenská župa. In the next season they won their first official game against Sokol Kremnica. Hockey in Zvolen was even played during World War II. After WW II they had very successful years between 1947 and 1953. Then there was a decline.

Czechoslovak era
Renewal of hockey in Zvolen started in 1964, when the Lokomotíva Bučina Zvolen club was established. In 1970 they promoted to the 1. SNHL (1st. Slovak National Hockey League), second level of Czechoslovak hockey. They placed 6th in their first season at the 1. SNHL. In the 1971–72 season they finished 3rd and in the next season they won the 1. SNHL. The club's scoring leader was Jozef Golonka. Zvolen qualified for the preliminary round of the Czechoslovak Extraliga. There they lost 7 of 8 games and were not promoted to the Extraliga. Zvolen won the 1. SNHL again in the 1974–75 season. Zvolen forward Ján Letko was the top scorer of the 1. SNHL (48 goals). However, they lost in the preliminary round against Ingstav Brno and were not promoted to the Extraliga. In the 1975–76 season they repeated victory in the 1. SNHL. In the preliminary round they lost a series 3–4 against TJ Gottwaldov. Their fourth and last victory of the 1. SNHL came in the 1977–78 season, but in the preliminary round they lost a series 2–4 against TJ Gottwaldov. Thus Zvolen never played in the Czechoslovak Extraliga, the top level of Czechoslovak hockey.

Slovak era
 
Zvolen was a member of the inaugural season of the Slovak Extraliga, but they finished last and were relegated to the Slovak 1.Liga. Zvolen won the 1996–97 Slovak 1.Liga season and promoted to the Extraliga after 3 years. In the 1997–98 season they placed fifth in the regular season and were eliminated by Dukla Trenčín in the quarterfinals. In the next season they progressed to the semifinals, beating Trenčín in the quarterfinals, but were defeated by Slovan Bratislava. Zvolen played in the playoffs finals for the first time in club history in the 1999–00 season. There they lost 2–3 against Slovan. The most successful season in the club history was the 2000–01 season. Zvolen finished first in the regular season, defeated 3–0 MHC Martin in the quarterfinals, 3–0 HK Poprad in the semifinals, 3–1 Dukla Trenčín in the finals and won their first Slovak Extraliga title ever. Ján Plch (79 pts), Richard Šechný (70 pts) and Petr Vlk (64 pts) were the top three scoring leaders of the Extraliga regular season. Šechný (19 pts) was also a scoring leader in the playoffs. Since 2001 Zvolen was playoffs finalist four times but won the title only once more in the 2012–13 season.

Continental Cup
Besides their triumph at the Slovak championship in 2001, Zvolen is a winner of the IIHF Continental Cup. In the 8th edition of the cup in 2005 they played in the final stage against HC Dynamo Moscow, Alba Volán Székesfehérvár and the Milano Vipers. Zvolen won all three games and became the third Slovak winner after HC Košice and HC Slovan Bratislava.

Honours

Domestic

Slovak Extraliga
  Winners (3): 2000–01, 2012–13, 2020–21
  Runners-up (4): 1999–2000, 2001–02, 2003–04, 2004–05
  3rd place (3): 2002–03, 2018–19, 2021–22

Slovak 1. Liga
  Winners (1): 1996–97
  Runners-up (2): 1994–95, 1995–96

1st. Slovak National Hockey League
  Winners (4): 1972–73, 1974–75, 1975–76, 1977–78
  Runners-up (3): 1973–74, 1976–77, 1980–81
  3rd place (1): 1971–72

International
IIHF Continental Cup
  Winners (1): 2004–05
  3rd place (1): 2001–02

Pre-season
Rona Cup
  Winners (2): 2001, 2008

Players

Current roster

Sponsorship
HKM Zvolen has a list of sponsors such as Urpiner, Doprastav, OS Zvolen, COOP Jednote Krupina,  ZOS Loko, INMEDIA, KOŠÚT Plus, BDI, Almik, Geis, Vezopax, J&K Invest Group, Betamont, Retech and Instaforex.

Notable coaches

 Pavel Zábojník
 Ernest Bokroš
 František Hossa
 Ladislav Svozil
 Peter Mikula
 Július Šupler
 Peter Oremus

Notable players

 Jozef Golonka
 Ján Letko
 Ján Podkonický
 Bohumil Trávník
 Roman Čunderlík
 Miroslav Žabka
 Róbert Pukalovič
 Miroslav Michalek
 Dušan Pohorelec
 Ladislav Čierny
 Jozef Čierny
 Ján Lašák
 Ján Laco
 Vlastimil Plavucha
 Richard Šechný
 Jaroslav Török
 Michal Handzuš
 Vladimír Országh
 Richard Zedník
 Martin Bartek
 Peter Pucher
 Tomáš Tatar
 Martin Trochta
 Marek Ďaloga
 Andrej Podkonický
 Lukáš Jurík
 Kamil Brabenec
 Martin Bartek
 Peter Pucher

Championship winner teams
2000/2001
Coaches: Ernest Bokroš, Peter Mikula,
Goalies: Rastislav Rovnianek, Peter Ševela,
Defenders: Róbert Pukalovič, Rastislav Štork, Peter Klepáč, Dušan Milo, Roman Čech, Pavel Kowalczyk, Pavel Augusta, Milota Florián, Vladimír Konôpka, Martin Mráz
Forwards: Dušan Pohorelec, Richard Šechný, Andrej Rajčák, Ján Plch, Petr Vlk, Jaroslav Török, Jozef Čierny, Michal Longauer, Peter Konder, Igor Majeský, Rostislav Vlach, Kamil Mahdalík, Ladislav Paciga, Ondřej Kavulič, Gabriel Špilár, Roman Macoszek
2012/2013
Coaches: Peter Mikula, Jaroslav Török
Goalies: Marek Šimko, Igor Cibuľa, Lukáš Škrečko
Defenders: Ján Mucha, Michal Pihnarčík, Michal Juraško, Martin Výborný, Jaroslav Hertl, Peter Novajovský, Peter Hraško, Lubor Pokovič, Ladislav Čierny, Ján Ťavoda, Zdenko Tóth
Forwards:Michal Chovan, Jaroslav Kalla, Peter Zuzin, Lukáš Jurík, Kamil Brabenec, Kamil Mahdalík, Milan Jurík, Radovan Puliš, Andrej Podkonický, Tomáš Škvaridlo, Jaroslav Kalla, Marek Čurilla, Ľubor Zuzin, Patrik Huňady, Martin Ďaloga, Matej Síkela, Milan Čanky,
2020/2021
Coaches: Peter Oremus, Andrek Kmeč, Andrej Podkonický
Goalies: Robin Rahm, Adam Trenčan
Defenders: Jakub Meliško, Michal Ivan, Oldřich Kotvan, František Gajdoš, Peter Hraško, Ben Betker, Andrej Hatala, T.J. Melancon, Marek Daloga, Branislav Kubka, Tomás Nociar, Jakub Debnár
Forwards: Marco Halama, Marek Viedenský, Peter Zuzin, Juraj Mikúš, Maroš Jedlička, Allan McPherson, Adam Helewka, Radovan Puliš, Patrik Marcinek, Jozef Tibenský, Jakub Čunderlík, Mikko Nuutinen, Ján Chlepčok, Dalibor Ďuriš, Jakub Kolenič, Nikolas Gubančok, Miloš Kelemen, Miloš Kelemen, Radovan Bondra, Marko Brumerčík, Václav Stupka, Adrián Daniš

See also
List of Slovak ice hockey champions

References

External links
Official website

Notes

 
Zvolen, HKM
Zvolen, HKM
Interliga (1999–2007) teams
H
Ice hockey clubs established in 1927
1927 establishments in Czechoslovakia
Sport in Banská Bystrica Region